Atteva niphocosma is a moth of the  family Attevidae. It is found in the Australian states of  New South Wales, Queensland and northern Western Australia.

The wingspan is about 30 mm.

The larvae live communally in a web spun amongst the foliage of Polyscias murrayi and pupate more or less exposed in the web.

External links
Australian Faunal Directory
Australian Insects

Attevidae
Moths described in 1903